Glasgow Queen's Park was a short-lived burgh constituency represented in the House of Commons of the Parliament of the United Kingdom from 1974 until 1983. It elected one Member of Parliament (MP) using the first-past-the-post voting system

Boundaries
The County of the City of Glasgow wards of Gorbals, Govanhill, and Hutchesontown, and part of Langside ward.

The constituency covered part of inner city Glasgow, to the south of the River Clyde and in the south-west of the city.

Before the February 1974 general election, the area had formed the major part of Glasgow Gorbals (Gorbals, Hutchesontown and part of Govanhill wards) and part of Glasgow Cathcart (the rest of Govanhill and Langside wards).

In the 1983 redistribution, this constituency disappeared. 675 voters (2.0% of its electorate) were transferred to Glasgow Cathcart, 27,528 electors became part of Glasgow Central (79.7%), and the remaining 6,332 voters (18.4%) were included in the electorate of Glasgow Rutherglen.

Members of Parliament

Election results 

 Death of Frank McElhone

References 

 British Parliamentary Election Results 1974-1983, compiled and edited  by F.W.S. Craig (Parliamentary Research Services 1984).

Historic parliamentary constituencies in Scotland (Westminster)
Constituencies of the Parliament of the United Kingdom established in 1974
Constituencies of the Parliament of the United Kingdom disestablished in 1983
Politics of Glasgow
Gorbals
Govanhill and Crosshill